Maya Lawrence (born 1980) is an American fencer and part of the United States Fencing Team at the 2012 Summer Olympics in London, where she participated in the individual and team épée events in the Fencing competition.  She won a bronze medal in the women's team épée alongside Courtney Hurley, Kelley Hurley, and Susie Scanlan.

Lawrence grew up in Teaneck, New Jersey and attended Teaneck High School, where she took up fencing as a sophomore before graduating in 1998. Her parents are Pat Lawrence, Teaneck High School's fencing coach, and Reginald Lawrence, who has been a sports official in New Jersey. In 2002, Lawrence graduated with honors from Princeton University with a double major in political science and African-American studies. A member of Princeton's fencing team, she was selected as an All-American and earned Ivy League honors during all four years of her attendance there. She earned a Master's degree in English as a Second Language instruction in 2007 from Teachers College, Columbia University.

See also
List of Princeton University Olympians

References

1980 births
Living people
Fencers at the 2012 Summer Olympics
Princeton University alumni
Teachers College, Columbia University alumni
Teaneck High School alumni
Olympic bronze medalists for the United States in fencing
Medalists at the 2012 Summer Olympics
American female épée fencers
African-American sportswomen
21st-century African-American sportspeople
21st-century African-American women
20th-century African-American people
20th-century African-American women